Tennessee Valley Weather is a television station owned by the Tennessee Valley Media, LLC, headquartered in Lawrenceburg, Tennessee. It services North Alabama, Southern Tennessee, and Northeast Mississippi with daily weather updates and local severe weather information. The combined network broadcasts over-the-air updates, social media posts, and produces live content on a digital streaming television channel available on a host of Internet based platforms, as well as local cable providers.

History
Due to the location of the Tennessee Valley within Dixie Alley, a region prone to violent and long-tracked tornadoes, much focus has been given to researching and warning weather events in the region. Lawrence County, Tennessee is the site of the only F-5 rated tornado in Tennessee history, occurring on April 16, 1998, dubbed "The Forgotten F5". One of the parent companies, WLLX, a radio station in Lawrenceburg, Tennessee, has owned a weather radar since 1987 for general precipitation observing. In February 2020, an EF-1 tornado impacted the town of Lawrenceburg with little warning, leading to discussions of the necessity of better warning processes. Subsequently, Tennessee Valley Weather launched in April 2020 following a merger of WLLX and Shoals Weather, a digital weather information provider in Florence, Alabama. In 2022, Tennessee Valley Weather transitioned ownership to Tennessee Valley Media, a multimedia corporation in Southern Tennessee.

Programming
Network meteorologists produce multiple updates daily regarding weather condition within the region. The channel's chief meteorologist, Fred Gossage, produces a weekly educational segment highlighting the science behind the area's weather. The channel also owns and operates a network of weather cameras positioned in a host of communities throughout the Tennessee Valley region. The station also broadcasts live coverage of severe weather advisories and warnings, when active.

Technology

Tennessee Valley Weather employs a wide array of technology, including Baron Services Lynx, a Furuno WR2120 Dual Polarimetric Doppler weather radar, for which it founded the non-profit Tennessee Valley Weather Radar Foundation, and a network of weather sensors and cameras. The network also operates a Mobile app available in both the App Store and Google Play.

Notable on-air staff
 Ben Luna - Managing Meteorologist (Longtime WLLX broadcaster and former WAAY-TV weekend meteorologist)
 Fred Gossage - Chief Meteorologist (Co-Founder of Shoals Weather and former WBRC-TV weather operations assistant)
 Drew Richards - Evening Weekend Meteorologist (Co-Founder of Shoals Weather)
 Bryan Wilson - Morning & Afternoon Weekend Meteorologist (Expert Radar Technician)
 Kelli Rosson - Afternoon Weekday Meteorologist (former WYMT-TV Meteorologist)

References

External links
 

Television stations in Tennessee
Television stations in Alabama
Weather television networks